James Kerr (September 24, 1790 – December 23, 1850) was a doctor, politician, Senator in Missouri, soldier, surveyor and Congressman in Texas who was active in the establishment of the Republic of Texas.

Early life and family

Kerr was born near Danville, Kentucky, the son of a Baptist minister. Reared in Missouri, Kerr fought in the War of 1812 and was later sheriff of St. Charles County, Missouri. In 1818, he married Angeline Caldwell, the daughter of James Caldwell, Missouri's first House Speaker.

Kerr served in the Missouri House of Representatives during its first two terms after statehood. In 1824 he defeated his father-in-law in a race for the Missouri State Senate. He served a single term in the body.

Career in Texas

Kerr was appointed Surveyor General of the Texas colony of Green DeWitt in 1825. With his wife, three children and several slaves, he joined Stephen F. Austin's "Old Three Hundred" colony in Brazoria. In August 1825, he set out to select a site for the Dewitt Colony. Kerr named the community Gonzales in honor of the governor of the Mexican state of Coahuila.

By this time, Angeline Kerr and two of the children had died. Kerr was active in area politics and law enforcement during the formative years of the Texas Republic. He acted as attorney and surveyor for Benjamin Rush Milam in 1827. He negotiated for peace before the Fredonian Rebellion, signed a treaty with the Karankawa Indians, and fought other tribes. In 1832, he was the delegate from Port Lavaca at the Convention at San Felipe de Austin northwest of Houston. He also served as a member of the Second and Third conventions. In 1834, Kerr married the former Sarah Fulton.

He became a major in the Texas Rangers in 1835 and in the army of the Texas Republic in 1836. He participated in the Battle of Lipantitlán on November 4, 1835.

He was elected to the Third Texas Congress in 1838, where he represented Jackson County in the Texas House.

Kerr's later years were spent practicing medicine in Jackson County west of Houston.

Legacy

In 1856, pioneer Joshua Brown gave the land that became the Kerrville townsite and named it "Kerrville" for his long-time friend, James Kerr, who had died six years earlier.

See also
List of Convention of 1832 delegates

References

External links
James Kerr's entry in the Biographical Encyclopedia of Texas hosted by the Portal to Texas History.

1790 births
1850 deaths
Convention of 1832 delegates
Members of the Missouri House of Representatives
Members of the Texas Legislature
Members of the Texas Ranger Division
Politicians from Danville, Kentucky
People from Brazoria County, Texas
Missouri state senators
Missouri sheriffs
American military personnel of the War of 1812
Kerr County, Texas